Theodore "Ted” Ku-DiPietro (born January 28, 2002) is an American professional soccer player who plays as a midfielder for D.C. United in Major League Soccer.

Early life 
Ku-DiPietro was a standout player at Oakton High School in his hometown of Oakton, Virginia, being named first-team all-state as a sophomore in 2018.

Club career

Loudoun United 
Ku-DiPietro played his first professional game on June 28, 2019, winning 2–1 against Atlanta United 2. Ku-DiPietro scored his first-ever professional goal in his first season with Loudoun United, on September 25, 2019, in the 68th minute of the team's 4–1 win over the Swope Park Rangers. Ku-DiPietro also received his first-ever red card in the same match.

Ku-DiPietro signed his first professional contract with Loudoun on January 7, 2020.

D.C. United 
After appearing three seasons with Loudoun, Ku-DiPietro became the 17th homegrown player signing for D.C. United. In the opening match of the 2023 season, he scored his first goal for the club – the game-winning goal in a 3–2 comeback victory over Toronto. After coming on as a second-half substitute, Ku-DiPietro assisted on Christian Benteke's game-tying goal in the 90th minute before scoring himself. As a result, he was named to Major League Soccer's Team of the Matchday for week one.

Career statistics

Club

Personal life
Ku-DiPietro was born into a family of nine children, and six (including himself) have played soccer at least at the youth level. His older brother, Michael, played for the Marymount Saints men's soccer team before graduating with a Business Administration degree. His younger sister, Hope, signed a letter of intent to play with the George Washington Colonials women's soccer team in the Fall 2023 season.

References

2002 births
Living people
American soccer players
Association football midfielders
D.C. United players
Loudoun United FC players
USL Championship players
People from Oakton, Virginia
Soccer players from Virginia
Homegrown Players (MLS)
Major League Soccer players